Hira Unka (1 June 1943 – 10 August 2012) was a New Zealand cricketer. He played in 25 first-class and five List A matches for Northern Districts between 1968 and 1976.

A right-arm opening bowler, Unka took his best first-class figures in the opening match of the 1973–74 Plunket Shield: 6 for 67 against Otago. He also played Hawke Cup cricket for Bay of Plenty from 1970 to 1981.

See also
 List of Northern Districts representative cricketers

References

External links
 

1943 births
2012 deaths
New Zealand cricketers
Northern Districts cricketers
Cricketers from Mysore